The Sultan Ismail Power Station is the largest gas turbine power station in Malaysia, Located in Paka, Terengganu approximately 100 km away from the state capital, Kuala Terengganu. It generates 1,136 MW electricity.

The station is the first and still remains the largest plant of this combined cycle type in Tenaga Nasional. With a capacity of 1150 MW, it is the second largest power plant after Port Klang Power Station. The station uses natural gas as the main fuel. The gas is supplied by Petronas from its nearby gas processing plant.

History
The station was completed in 1987 and officially opened in 1988 by Almarhum Sultan Mahmud Al-Muktafi Billah Shah of Terengganu.

Type of power station
The type of power station is an oil and gas turbine from Petronas oil and gas refinery in Kerteh.

Oil-fired power stations in Malaysia
Natural gas-fired power stations in Malaysia